Malawi ranks 170th out of 174 in the World Health Organization lifespan tables; 88% of the population live on less than £2.40 per day; and 50% are below the poverty line.

Introduction
Malawi  is perturbed by a heavy double burden of disease from both communicable and non-communicable diseases. This is evidenced by high levels of child and adult mortality rates and high prevalence of diseases such as tuberculosis, malaria, HIV/AIDS and other communicable diseases. In addition to that, there is growing evidence  that suggests that there is a growing burden of non-communicable diseases which account nearly 32% of all deaths. According to the recent 2018 Census done by the National Statistical Office in Malawi, the country has a total population of 17.5 million people. Nearly 15% of the population is composed of under five children, 36% is aged between 5 and 17 years and 49.7% is aged 18 years and above

Health status

Top 10 causes of death in Malawi 

There has been a shift in causes of mortality in many countries over the years. This can be as result of different factors like improved health interventions and access to health care, improved economic and social status and improved knowledge. This has resulted into a shift in the global burden of disease. According to the Institute for Health Metrics and Evaluation (IHME) the top ten causes of death in Malawi are:

 HIV/AIDS (18.17%)
 Respiratory infections and tuberculosis (12.96%)
 Cardiovascular diseases (11.6%)
  Maternal and neonatal disorders (9.36%)
 Neoplasms (7.8%)
  Enteric infections (6.27%)
  Neglected tropical diseases and malaria (5.76%)
 Digestive diseases (4.34%)
 Other infectious diseases (4.29%)
 Other non-communicable disease (3.99%).

Life expectancy 
As of 2018 the estimated average life expectancy at birth in Malawi is at 64 years, with females having a slightly higher life expectancy at 67  years than males at 61.4 years.

Fertility rate 
In 2014 Malawi had a total fertility rate of 2.1 children born/woman.

Infectious diseases 
There is a high degree of risk for major infectious diseases, including bacterial and protozoal diarrhea, hepatitis A, typhoid fever, malaria, plague, schistosomiasis and rabies.

HIV/AIDS 

In 2013 Malawi had a HIV/AIDS adult prevalence rate of 11%. In 2013 there were 920,000 people living with HIV/AIDS, and 51,000 AIDS related deaths.
Data indicate that 8.8% of women and men aged 15–49 have HIV and the prevalence is higher among women than men (10.8% versus 6.4%).

Due to the vast scope of the HIV/AIDS epidemic, many Malawian men believe that HIV contraction and death from AIDS are inevitable. Older men in particular often claim that the HIV/AIDS epidemic is a punishment issued by God or other supernatural forces. Other men refer to their own irresponsible sexual behaviors when explaining why they believe that death from AIDS is inevitable.

These men sometimes claim that unprotected sex is natural (and therefore necessary and good) when justifying their lack of condom use during sex with extramarital partners. Finally, some men identify as HIV-positive without having undergone testing for HIV, preferring to believe that they have already been infected so they can avoid adopting undesirable preventative measures such as condom use or strict fidelity. Because of these fatalistic beliefs, many men continue engaging in extramarital sexual relations despite the prevalence of HIV/AIDS in Malawi.

However, despite these widespread feelings of fatalism, some men believe that they can avoid HIV contraction by modifying their personal behaviors. Men who decide to change their behaviors to reduce their risk of infection are unlikely to use condoms consistently, particularly during marital intercourse; instead, they usually continue engaging in extramarital sexual relations, but alter the ways in which they choose their sexual partners.

For example, before selecting extramarital sexual partners, men sometimes survey their peers to determine whether their potential partners are likely to have exposed themselves to the virus. Men who choose their sexual partners based on external appearances and peer recommendations often believe that women who violate traditional gender norms by, for example, wearing modern clothing are more likely to carry HIV, while young girls, who are perceived as sexually inexperienced, are considered "pure". Because of this perception, many people are concerned that schoolchildren in Malawi, particularly girls, are becoming exposed to the virus through sexual harassment or abuse by their instructors.

Coronavirus

Tuberculosis

It is estimated that there are more than 14% cases of tuberculosis infections worldwide in year with 9 million new cases and nearly 1.7 deaths. In 2014 the incidence of tuberculosis was 227 per 100,000 people in Malawi. The good news is that the incidence is declining by 1.5% each, however the transmission still remains high.

Endemic diseases

Malaria 

Malawi has made progress in malaria control in recent years; between 2006 and 2015, the mortality rate for children under five years of age declined from 122 deaths per 1,000 live births to an estimated 64 deaths per 1,000 live births. Despite this progress, malaria continues to be a major public health problem in Malawi. It is endemic in more than 95 percent of the country and is one of the major causes of morbidity and mortality across all age groups. Malaria is responsible for approximately 6.2 million presumed and confirmed cases reported annually from health facilities and by the community case management program, and 36 percent of all outpatient visits across all ages. Among children under five years of age, malaria parasite prevalence by microscopy was 33 percent nationally. Transmission is perennial in most areas and peaks during the rainy season from November to April. Higher malaria transmission occurs along Lake Malawi and the lowland areas of the lower Shire Valley. The Plasmodium falciparum parasite is the most common species of malaria. Resistance of anopheline vectors to insecticides has been extensively documented in Malawi, limiting the options for indoor residual spraying and raising concern regarding the continued effectiveness of insecticide-treated mosquito nets. To control malaria, the Ministry of Health's National Malaria Control Program has scaled up the distribution of artemisinin-based combination therapies, intermittent preventive treatment for pregnant women using sulfadoxine-pyrimethamine, and insecticide-treated nets.

Maternal and child healthcare 

Maternal health has improved in Malawi due to a number of factors. There has been improvement made in proportion of births attended by skilled professional. The proportion has increased from 54.8% in 1992 to 87.4% in 2014. In addition to that, the maternal mortality is on the decrease though at a slower rate. Since 1990 the maternal mortality ratio has decreased from 1100 deaths per 100,000 people to 510 deaths per 100,000 people in 2013.
Improved access to sexual and reproductive health services has also contributed to the improvements in maternal health. Knowledge and of family planning is almost universal in Malawi with 98% of women and nearly 100% of men  age 15-49 knowing at least one method of contraception.
Child health has also improved in Malawi. According to the Demographic Health Survey (DHS) report, the number of children dying before reaching their fifth birthday has declined, from 234 deaths per 1000 live births in 1992 to 63 deaths per 1000 live births in 2015-16.
Child health is an important area to focus our efforts to better the health status because children are the most vulnerable group (especially those below the age of five), and most importantly it is their right to survive and live better lives. In Malawi, the child mortality rate is very high although there has been a decline over the years, from 234 deaths per 1000 live births in 1992 to 63 deaths per 1000 live births in 2015. In addition, the neonatal mortality has gone down to 27 deaths per 1000 live birth in 2004.

Non-communicable diseases
The shift in the burden of disease has led to non-communicable diseases (NCDs) becoming the leading cause of death globally, most of these deaths are due to cardiovascular disease, cancer, chronic respiratory diseases, or diabetes. Mortality from many NCDs is on the rise worldwide, with a disproportionately larger burden in low-middle income countries (LMICs), where almost 3/4 of deaths globally occur from these causes. As of 2016 NCDs are estimated to account for 31.7% of deaths in Malawi, and the numbers are on the rise in countries throughout sub-Saharan Africa.

Health indicators
The CIA World Fact Book's "country comparison to the world" ranking indicates how Malawi's health indicators compare to other countries in the world. Since the first case of HIV/AIDS in Malawi in 1985, HIV/AIDS has drastically affected Malawi's health indicators.
Malawi's rankings:

Conclusion
Malawi still faces a major burden of disease both from communicable and non-communicable diseases. There is indeed progress in trying to combat these problems but a lot need to be done. There will be always problems but the country needs to establish a good way of dealing with the problems that are there, with the available resources, to prevent more loss life from preventable and treatable diseases.

See also 
 Healthcare in Malawi

References